The Business Process Management Journal is a peer-reviewed academic journal that covers the field of quality management. The editor-in-chief is Majed Al-Mashari (King Saud University). The journal was established in 1995 as the Business Process Re-engineering & Management Journal and obtained its current title in 1997. It is published by Emerald Group Publishing. The journal is abstracted and indexed in DIALOG, Inspec, ProQuest databases, and Scopus.

External links 
 

Emerald Group Publishing academic journals
English-language journals
Business and management journals
Publications established in 1995
Bimonthly journals
Hybrid open access journals